Gnoma pseudosuturalis is a species of beetle in the family Cerambycidae. It was described by Schwarzer in 1926. It is known from Sulawesi.

References

Lamiini
Beetles described in 1926